Visit to a Small Planet is a 1960 American black-and-white science fiction comedy film directed by Norman Taurog and starring Jerry Lewis, Joan Blackman, Earl Holliman, and Fred Clark. Distributed by Paramount Pictures, it was produced by Hal B. Wallis.

Visit to a Small Planet debuted as an original television production by Gore Vidal, then was reworked by Vidal as a Broadway play starring Cyril Ritchard and Eddie Mayehoff.

The film was released on February 4, 1960. It was re-released in 1966 on a double bill with another Jerry Lewis film, The Bellboy. It was Taurog’s last grayscale film.

Plot
Kreton is an alien from the planet X-47 who is fascinated by human beings. Against the wishes of his teacher, he repeatedly visits Earth. During his latest visit, his teacher reluctantly agrees to allow him to stay and study the humans. Kreton becomes friends with a suburban family and stays with them after they agree to keep his alien status a secret. Along the way, he falls in love with their daughter. However, there is a force field around him that prevents any physical contact. His race has abolished any form of affection.

Kreton's otherworldly abilities include levitation; the ability to communicate with the family dog; and forcing people he doesn't like to recite Mary Had A Little Lamb in public.

After repeatedly breaking his teacher's rule against getting involved in humans' lives, all Kreton's powers are stripped away. This is so he can discover for himself that being human comes with other, less desired, emotions like pain, sadness, and jealousy. Once his cover is blown on Earth and he is reported to the police, Kreton decides that those emotions are not worth the trouble, so he returns to his own planet.

Cast

 Jerry Lewis as Kreton
 Joan Blackman as Ellen Spelding
 Earl Holliman as Conrad
 Fred Clark as Major Roger Putnam Spelding
 John Williams as Delton
 Jerome Cowan as George Abercrombie
 Gale Gordon as Bob Mayberry
 Lee Patrick as Rheba Spelding
 Milton Frome as Police Commissioner
 Ellen Corby as Mrs. Mabel Mayberry
 Paul Wexler as Beatnik (uncredited)
 Barbara Bostock (credited as Barbara Lawson) as Beatnik Dancer Desdemona
 Buddy Rich as Beatnik Drummer 
 Orangey as Clementine (uncredited); voice of June Foray

Production
Visit to a Small Planet was filmed from April 28 through July 3, 1959.

Awards and nominations
Hal Pereira, Walter Tyler, Samuel M. Comer, and Arthur Krams were nominated for the 1960 Academy Award for Best Art Direction (Black and White), but lost to Alexandre Trauner and Edward G. Boyle for The Apartment.

Original play
Gore Vidal wrote Visit as a television play in which form it debuted on May 8, 1955, on Goodyear Television Playhouse. Later, he reworked it for the stage. Starring Cyril Ritchard, who also directed, and Eddie Mayehoff, the play had tryouts at the Shubert Theatre in New Haven, Connecticut January 16–19, 1957. On Broadway, it debuted on February 7, 1957, and ran for 388 performances. Ritchard received a Tony Award nomination for his performance as Kreton. Mayehoff also received a nomination for Best Performance by a Featured Actor.

Vidal intended the play as a satire on the post-World War II fear of communism in the United States, McCarthyism, Cold War military paranoia and the rising importance of television in American life. A major critical success, it was subtitled A Comedy Akin to Vaudeville.

The play tells the story of Kreton, an alien from an unnamed planet who lands on Earth intending to view the American Civil War. He miscalculates and lands instead 100 years later. Having missed the opportunity to see conflict first hand, but delighted with all the new playthings the 20th century has invented for war-making, he decides to create a war for himself.

Home media
The film was released on DVD and Blu-Ray on August 22, 2017.

Legacy
The film was selected by Quentin Tarantino for the third Quentin Tarantino Film Fest in Austin, Texas in 1999.

See also
 List of American films of 1960

References

Bibliography
 Warren, Bill. Keep Watching the Skies: American Science Fiction Films of the Fifties, 21st Century Edition. Jefferson, North Carolina: McFarland & Company, 2009 (First Edition 1982). .

External links
  (1955 TV production)
  (1957 Broadway show)
  (1960 film)
 

1960 films
1960s science fiction comedy films
American science fiction comedy films
American black-and-white films
1960s English-language films
Fiction portraying humans as aliens
Films about extraterrestrial life
Films directed by Norman Taurog
Films produced by Hal B. Wallis
Paramount Pictures films
Films scored by Leigh Harline
Films based on works by Gore Vidal
1960 comedy films
1960s American films